Western Township may refer to one of the following places in the United States:

 Western Township, Henry County, Illinois
 Western Township, Logan County, Kansas
 Western Township, Otter Tail County, Minnesota
 Western Township, Knox County, Nebraska
 Western Township, Wells County, North Dakota

See also

 West Township (disambiguation)

Township name disambiguation pages